Manthenavaripalem is a village in Guntur district in the state of Andhra Pradesh in India.

Famous people from this village:

 Sri Manthena Venkata Raju (1904-1968) - Freedom fighter

Villages in Guntur district